The nursery web spider Pisaura mirabilis is a spider species of the family Pisauridae.

==Description==
Striking characteristics of Pisaura mirabilis are its long legs (the fourth one being the longest) and its slender abdomen (opisthosoma). The male is between 10 and 13 mm, while the female is 12 to 15 mm. After final ecdysis, the male spiders weigh on average 54 mg and females 68 mg.

The prosoma (cephalothorax) is variable in color, ranging from light to reddish brown and from gray to black. A lighter stripe is visible down the middle of the prosoma. The opisthosoma (abdomen) is long and narrow and tapered towards the rear end.

The female spiders has a dark patch (epigyne) on the underside of her abdomen that includes the copulatory organs. Male genital openings can be found at the same location, but remain inconspicuous.

Patterning and coloration varies due to polymorphism. These patterns, which can be caused by hair and pigments, change with the growth of the spider (ontogenesis).

Male spiders are stronger in contrast than females and look black, especially in comparison to the white nuptial gifts. Females tend to get paler towards the end of summer. The stripe along the back of the body can be found in all spiders and can be seen as crypsis, a protective measure against predators. The pedipalps in nymphs and females look similar to legs. In males, this structure gets thicker towards the end and is used to store sperm until reproduction (bulbus). The outer chelicerae segment consists of three teeth. They catch their prey during the day and at night and are also active on warm winter days.

Habitat and distribution 
Pisaura mirabilis has a palearctic distribution, and can be found all over Europe. These spiders inhabit the Canary Islands and Madeira, the Asian part of Russia, China and North Africa.

P. mirabilis lives in all habitats, but prefers wet environments, such as wet meadows, lowland moors, salt marshes, dunes, the edge of forests, and wet hedges. It inhabits all strata, from the ground to the top of trees, but are not found under rocks or in caves. These spiders can be found at altitudes up to 1500 m.

Life cycle 
The spider develops from a fertilised egg inside a cocoon into an embryo. After inversion, the embryo enters the prelarval stage. A few hours later, the prelarva moults into a larva. At this stage, the spiders are colorless but mobile, and can detect sensory signals from its surrounding. They do not have any eyes yet and their chelicerae are short and sharp. A few fine hairs can be found on their feet.

Depending on the temperature, the larvae moult after 4.5 – 7.5 days into the first nymphal stage. Once leaving the cocoon through an opening, they live in a protective web made by the mother, where they feed on the leftover yolk from their eggs and drink from water droplets. After about a week, the nymphs start suspending themselves from their own spider silk and start preying on fruit flies. This usually happens in the sixth or seventh nymphal stage. Cannibalism does not occur in the first few days, but occurs in later stages. The whole nymphal stage is divided into 12 stages at most. Male spiders become sexually mature in the 9th to 11th stages, females in the 10th to 12th stages. Temperature can influence the development and number of stages, with colder temperatures slowing down the process. Under good conditions, spiders can complete their nymphal development in fewer than 12 stages. The duration from prelarval stage to final moult (maturity) typically lasts 257 days for males (stage 10) and 289 days for females (stage 11). Adulthood is the period after final moult till death. Females live longer than males, the record being 247 days for females and 186.5 days for males.

Depending on habitat, nursery web spiders hibernate once or twice during the nymphal stage. The period of hibernation (diapause) is spent in ground vegetation under leaves, moss, and stones. They can be found in garages and houses, as well. Some individuals in the south of France have been found under loose bark of the plane tree. The nymphs in stages 6 to 8 start hibernating in November and continue with their development towards the end of February to the beginning of March.

Pisaura mirabilis in Western and Central Europe reach sexual maturity in May, when sperm uptake, the search for females, offering of nuptial gifts, and courtship and mating takes place. In Northern and Eastern Europe, spiders reach sexual maturity only in June, while in Southern Europe, they become sexually mature in April.

Nursery web spiders have a one-year annual cycle in southern Europe. They grow in summer, hibernate in winter, reach adulthood in spring, and reproduce and then die in autumn. Their offspring are sexually mature in the following spring. Spiders from the north have a two-year cycle, having to go through two hibernations before reaching sexual maturity. Spiders in Western and Central Europe have a mix of both one- and two-year cycles. Males have a two-month period to reproduce; females three and a half.

Mating system
Males of this species offer a nuptial gift to potential female mates. Some Pisaura mirabilis specimens have also been observed to use thanatosis during courtship. After presenting the nuptial gift to the female, she bites on to the gift and the male moves to her epigyne to deposit sperm with his pedipalps. Throughout copulation, the male keeps a leg on the gift so as to be ready if she tries to escape with it or attack him. At this time, the male may feign death – his limbs become straight and he is dragged along with the female while holding on to the gift. When the female stops, the male slowly "resurrects" and continues attempting to mate. Thanatosis in P. mirabilis has been observed to significantly increase the male's odds of successfully copulating from less than 30% to 89%.

Predators, parasites, and pathogens 
Predators of Pisaura mirabilis includes spider wasps, tree frogs, lizards, and song birds during the day, and toads, shrew mice, and bats at night. Other spider species, as well as from the same species (cannibalism), consider P. mirabilis as prey.

Nursery web spiders are often parasitised by nematodes, parasitic wasps, and Acari. These parasites infect the spider and its eggs and cocoons, which can lead to destruction of a whole clutch of eggs.

Baculoviridae and Rickettsia species infect nursery web spiders, as well. They most likely enter the gastrointestinal tract via the spiders' prey. Not only can nymphs and adults be infected, but different stages in the cocoon are infected, as well.

See also
 List of Pisauridae species
 Spider families

References

Further reading
 
 A. Lang, C. Klarenberg: Experiments on the foraging behaviour of the hunting spider Pisaura mirabilis (Araneae, Pisauridae): Utilisation of single prey items. Eur. J. Ent. 94: 453–459, 1997
 A. Lang: A note on body size parameters and some life data of Pisaura mirabilis (Araneae, Pisauridae). Proc. XV. Eur. Coll. Arachnol. 111–115, 1995
 A. Lang: Silk investment in gifts by males of the nuptial feeding spider Pisaura mirabilis (Araneae, Pisauridae). Behaviour 133: 697–716, 1996
 A. Lang: Die Spinnseide des Brautgeschenks bei Pisaura mirabilis (Clerck 1757) (Araneae, Pisauridae). Diplomarbeit Univ. München, 1991
 B. Baehr, M. Baehr: Welche Spinne ist das? Kleine Spinnenkunde für jedermann. Franckh Kosmos Verlag, Stuttgart, 1987,
 C. Clerck: Svenska spindlar. Aranei svecici. Stockholm, 1757
 C. D. Dondale, R. Legendre: Winter diapause in a Mediterranean population of Pisaura mirabilis (Clerck). Bull. Br. Arach. Soc. 2 (1): 6–10
 C. F. Roewer: Katalog der Aranae von 1758 bis 1954. 2a: 110–151, Bruxelles, 1954
 Carl Linné: Systema naturae. Per regna tria naturae, secundum classes, ordines, genera, species, cum characteribus, differentiis, synonymis, locis. Tomus 1. Editio decima, reformata, Holmiae, Facsimile 1956 Jarrolds Norwich, 1758
 Dick Jones: Der Kosmos Spinnenführer. Franckh Kosmos Verlag, 1990, 
 F. Dahl, M. Dahl: 3. Spinnentiere oder Arachnoidea. I-II. G. Fischer Jena, 1926/27
 F. Dahl: Die Lycosiden oder Wolfsspinnen Deutschlands und ihre Stellung im Haushalte der Natur. Nach statistischen Untersuchungen dargestellt. Nova acta Acad. Caes. Leop. Carol. 88: 175–678, 1908
 F. Renner: Spinnen ungeheuer – sympathisch. Rainar Nitzsche Verlag, Kaiserslautern, 1990/2008, 
 F. Sauer, J. Wunderlich: Die schönsten Spinnen Europas. Fauna Verlag, Karlsfeld, 1984
 G. Le Pape,: Relations entre comportement alimentaire et comportement sexuel chez Pisaura mirabilis (Aranéide, Pisauride). Rev. Comp. Anim. 8: 71–75, 1974
 G. Le Pape: Contribution à l'étude du comportment reproducteur en liaison avec l'alimentation chez quatre Arachnides: Teutana grossa, Pardosa lugubris, Pisaura mirabilis, Buthus occitanus. Thèse Doctorat d'Etat Univ. Rennes, 1972
 G. Schmidt: Das Liebes- und Familienleben der Heidejagdspinne. Aus der Heimat 60: 153–154, 1952
 G. Schmidt: Psychologie einer Spinne. Die Heidejagdspinne und ihre Bedeutung für die Umweltforschung. Orion 10: 560–568, 1955
 G. Schmidt: Spinnen. Alles Wissenswerte über Lebensweise, Sammeln, Haltung und Zucht. A. Philler, Minden, 1980
 G. Schmidt: Zur Spinnenfauna der Kanaren, Madeiras und der Azoren. Stuttgarter Beitr. Naturk. Ser. A 451: 1–46
 G. Schmidt: Zur Spinnenfauna von Gran Canaria. Zool. Beitr. N. F. 19: 347–392, 1973
 G. Schmidt: Zur Spinnenfauna von La Gomera. Zool. Beitr. (N. F.) 27: 85–107
 G. Schmidt: Zur Spinnenfauna von Teneriffa. Zool. Beitr. N. F. 14: 387–425, 1968
 H. Lucas: Arachnides, Myriapodes et Thysanoures. In: M. P. Barker-Webb, S. Berthelot: Histoire Naturelle des Iles Canaries. Béthune, Paris, 1843
 H. Pfletschinger: Einheimische Spinnen. Die Webspinnen – Arten und Verhalten in 120 Farbfotos. Franck Kosmos Verlag, Stuttgart, 1976
 H. Stern, E. Kullmann: Leben am seidenen Faden. Die rätselvolle Welt der Spinnen. Bertelsmann Verlag, München, 1975
 H. W. Smolik: Weltreich der Tiere. Naturalis Verlag, München, 1987
 Hänggi, Stöckli und Nentwig: Lebensräume mitteleuropäischer Spinnen. Centre Suisse de cartographie de la faune. Neuchatel Verlag, 1995, 
 Heiko Bellmann: Kosmos-Atlas Spinnentiere Europas. Franck Kosmos Verlag, 1997, 
 Heiko Bellmann: Spinnen (die wichtigsten heimischen Arten, Extra: Netzformen und Eikokons). Franckh Kosmos Verlag, 1994
 Heiko Bellmann: Spinnen: beobachten – bestimmen, Naturbuch Verlag, Augsburg, 1992, 
 J. A. Barrientos: Dolomedes et Pisaura dans la région catalane (Araneida, Pisauridae). Rev. Arachol. 2: 17–21
 J. Wunderlich: Die Spinnen der Kanarischen Inseln und Madeiras. Triops Verlag, Langen, 1987
 J.-C. Bonaric: Contribution à l'étude de la biologie du développement chez l'araignée Pisaura mirabilis (Clerck 1758). Approche physiologique des phénomènes de mue et de diapause hivernale. Thèse Doctorat d'Etat, Univ. Montpellier, 1980
 J.-C. Bonaric: Evolution du métabolisme respiratoire de Pisaura mirabilis CL. (Araneae, Pisauridae) au cours de la période nympho-imaginale. Rev. Arachnol. 1: 33–43, 1977
 J.-C. Bonaric: La cycle vitale de l'araignée Pisaura mirabilis et ses adapatations. Bull. Soc. Zool. Fr. 110 (3): 269–274, 1985
 J.-C. Bonaric: Le développement post-embryonnaire de Pisaura mirabilis CL. (Araneae, Pisauridae). C. R. Acad. Sci. sér. D. 278: 3227–3230, 1974
 J.-C. Bonaric: Utilisation des barêmes trichobothriotaxiques comme critère d'âge chez Pisaura mirabilis CL. (Araneae, Pisauridae). Ann. Zool. 12e sér. 17: 521–534, 1975
 K. De Geer: Abhandlungen zur Geschichte der Insekten. 3. Abhandlung. Von den Spinnen. 7. Raspe Nürnberg, 1783
 M. J. Roberts: Spinnengids. Tirion, 1998
 Martin Lister: Historiae animalum angliae tres tractatus. London, 1678
 P. Blandin: Cycle biologique et production de l'araignée Afropisaura valida (Simon 1885)(Araneae, Pisauridae) dans une savane d'Afrique occidentale (Lamto, Côte-d'Ivoire). Trop. Ecol. 20: 78–93, 1974
 P. Blandin: Etudes sur les Pisauridae africaines. I-XI. Rev. Suisse Zool. 81, Rev. Zool. afr. 89–93, 1974–1979
 P. Grüne: Westfälische Spinnen. III. Die Haidespinnen. Natur Offenb.19: 213–223, 1873
 P. M. Brignoli: A Catalogue of the Aranea described between 1940 and 1981. Manchester Univ. Press, 1983
 P. M. Brignoli: Spiders from Libanon. III. Some notes on the Pisauridae, Agelenidae and Oxyopidae of the Near East. Bull. Br. arachnol. Soc. 4 (5): 204–209, 1978
 P. M. Brignoli: Zur Problematik der mediterranen Pisaura-Arten (Arachnida, Araneae, Pisauridae). Zool. Anz. 213: 33–43, 1984
 P. Pénicaud: Dynamique d'une population de l'araignée Pisaura mirabilis Cl. dans une lande bretonne. Thèse Doctorat d'Etat Univ. Paris, 1979
 Rainar Nitzsche: Beutefang und Brautgeschenk bei der Raubspinne Pisaura mirabilis (CL.)(Aranea,Pisauridae). Reprint der Diplomarbeit von 1981. Rainar Nitzsche Verlag, Kaiserslautern, 2006, 
 Rainar Nitzsche: Brautgeschenk und Reproduktion bei Pisaura mirabilis, einschließlich vergleichender Untersuchungen an Dolomedes fimbriatus und Thaumasia uncata (Araneida, Pisauridae). Reprint der Dissertation von 1987. Rainar Nitzsche Verlag, Kaiserslautern, 2006, 
 Rainar Nitzsche: Brautgeschenk und Umspinnen der Beute bei Pisaura mirabilis, Dolomedes fimbriatus und Thaumasia uncata (Arachnida, Araneida, Pisauridae). Verh. naturwiss. Ver. Hamburg (NF) 30, 1988
 Rainar Nitzsche: Brautgeschenke bei Spinnen – die heimische Pisaura mirabilis (CLERCK, 1757) und ihre Verwandten, die Kinderstubennetzspinnen (Pisauridae). Arachne 13 (1): 11–29, 2008
 Rainar Nitzsche: Courtship, mating and agonistic behaviour in Pisaura mirabilis (CLERCK, 1757). Bull. Br. arachnol. Soc. 15 (4): 93–120, 2011
 Rainar Nitzsche: Die Spinne mit dem Brautgeschenk Pisaura mirabilis (CLERCK, 1757) und das Paarungsverhalten verwandter Arten der Familie Pisauridae. Rainar Nitzsche Verlag, Kaiserslautern, 1999, 2007, 
 Rainar Nitzsche: Ein Geschenk für die Braut. Ohne Mitgift haben Raubspinnenmännchen keine Chance. Ein Herz für Tiere 7/1986
 Rainar Nitzsche: Raubspinnen. Kleine Geschenke fördern die Liebe. GEO 8/1985
 Rainer F. Foelix: Biologie der Spinnen. Thieme Verlag, Stuttgart, 1992, 
 Stefan Heimer, Wolfgang Nentwig: Spinnen Mitteleuropas. Ein Bestimmungsbuch. Parey Verlag, Berlin, Hamburg, 1991 
 Stefan Heimer: Wunderbare Welt der Spinnen. Landbuch Verlag, Hannover, 1988, 
 W. Bösenberg: Die Spinnen Deutschlands. Zoologica 14: 409–410, 1901
 Willi Lierath: Aus dem Reichtum der Natur. Die Brautgeschenkspinne. Vögel der Heimat 58 (12): 238–239, 1988

Films 
 J. Bublath: Räuber mit Netz. Das aufregende Leben der Spinnen. Aus Forschung und Technik, ZDF, 1987
 P. Hayden: Wenn Tiere zu Kannibalen werden. Killer in den eigenen Reihen, SWR (Südwest 3), 1999
 P. Schneider: Pisaura mirabilis, die Raub-, Jagd- oder Listspinne, HWF 14, Begleitheft Heidelberg, 1998
 E. R. Skinner, G. H. Thompson, J. A. L. Cooke: Commentary, spiders film 11: Pisauridae. Pisaura mirabilis – courtship and mating. Dolomedes fimbriatus – capture of food. Oxford (IWF W1017 T), 1966/67
 H. Stern: Bemerkungen über Spinnen 2.Meilensteine des Dokumentarfilms, Ein Franckh-Kosmos Video, Franckh Kosmos Stuttgart, 1975

External links
 
 
 Platnick: The World Spider Catalog – Pisauridae
 

Pisauridae
Spiders described in 1757
Taxa named by Carl Alexander Clerck
Spiders of Europe
Palearctic spiders